Stefan Bärlin (born 31 May 1976) is a Swedish former footballer. He made 37 Allsvenskan appearances for Djurgårdens IF and scored six goals.

Honours

Club 

 Djurgårdens IF
 Allsvenskan: 2002

References

External links 
  (archive)

1976 births
Living people
Swedish footballers
Sweden under-21 international footballers
Allsvenskan players
Eliteserien players
Västerås SK Fotboll players
Djurgårdens IF Fotboll players
IFK Göteborg players
Odds BK players
IK Start players
Swedish expatriate footballers
Expatriate footballers in Norway
Swedish expatriate sportspeople in Norway
Association football midfielders